WCJU (1450 AM) is a radio station licensed to Columbia, Mississippi, United States.  The station is currently owned by Wcjurporated.

History
WCJU began broadcasting in the spring of 1947. On September 26, 1947, The Federal Communications Commission approved the station's sale from Forrest Broadcasting Company to Lester Williams, a Mississippi publisher. The price was $25,000. At that time, WCJU operated full-time on 1450 kHz with 250 watts of power.

References

External links

CJU
Columbia, Mississippi